The 2012 Judo Grand Prix Düsseldorf was held in Düsseldorf, Germany from 18 to 19 February 2012.

Medal summary

Men's events

Women's events

Source Results

Medal table

References

External links
 

2012 IJF World Tour
2012 Judo Grand Prix
Judo
Judo competitions in Germany
Judo
Judo